The von Willebrand factor type A (vWA) domain is a protein domain named after its occurrence in von Willebrand factor (vWF), a large multimeric glycoprotein found in blood plasma. Mutant forms of vWF are involved in the aetiology of bleeding disorders. This type A domain is the prototype for a protein superfamily (see also Pfam clan).

The vWA domain is found in various plasma proteins: complement factors B, C2, CR3 and CR4; the integrins (I-domains); collagen types VI, VII, XII and XIV; and other extracellular proteins. Although the majority of vWA-containing proteins are extracellular, the most ancient ones present in all eukaryotes are all intracellular proteins involved in functions such as transcription, DNA repair, ribosomal and membrane transport and the proteasome. A common feature appears to be involvement in multiprotein complexes. Proteins that incorporate vWA domains participate in numerous biological events (e.g. cell adhesion, migration, homing, pattern formation, and signal transduction), involving interaction with a large array of ligands. A number of human diseases arise from mutations in vWA domains.

Secondary structure prediction from 75 aligned vWA sequences has revealed a largely alternating sequence of alpha-helices and beta-strands. Fold recognition algorithms were used to score sequence compatibility with a library of known structures: the vWA domain fold was predicted to be a doubly wound, open, twisted beta-sheet flanked by alpha-helices. 3D structures have been determined for the I-domains of integrins CD11b (with bound magnesium) and CD11a (with bound manganese). The domain adopts a classic alpha/beta Rossmann fold and contains an unusual metal ion coordination site at its surface. It has been suggested that this site represents a general metal ion-dependent adhesion site (MIDAS) for binding protein ligands. The residues constituting the MIDAS motif in the CD11b and CD11a I-domains are completely conserved, but the manner in which the metal ion is coordinated differs slightly.

Human proteins containing this domain
ANTXR1;    ANTXR2;    BF;        C2;        CACHD1;    CACNA2D1;  CACNA2D2;  CACNA2D3;
CACNA2D4;  CFB;       CLCA1;     CLCA2;     CLCA4;     COCH;      COL12A1;   COL14A1;
COL20A1;   COL21A1;   COL22A1;   COL28;     COL6A1;    COL6A2;    COL6A3;    COL7A1;
COLA1L;    CaCC1;     ITGA1;     ITGA10;    ITGA11;    ITGA2;     ITGAD;     ITGAE;
ITGAL;     ITGAM;     ITGAX;     ITIH1;     ITIH2;     ITIH3;     ITIH4;     ITIH5;
ITIH5L;    LOC285929; LOC340267; LOC389462; LOH11CR2A; MATN1;     MATN2;     MATN3;
MATN4;     PARP4;     SVEP1（SEL-OB）;     VIT;       VWA1;      VWA2;      VWF;
hCLCA1;    hCLCA2; CMG2;

References

External links
 

Protein domains
Single-pass transmembrane proteins